SB-200646 is a 5-HT2 receptor antagonist with anxiolytic properties in rats. It was the first 5-HT2 antagonist discovered to have selectivity of 5-HT2C/2B over 5-HT2A.

References 

5-HT2 antagonists
Anxiolytics
Indoles
3-Pyridyl compounds
Ureas